Union sportive de la Médina Aïn Béïda, known as USM Aïn Béïda or simply USMAB for short, is an Algerian football club based in Aïn Béïda in Oum El Bouaghi Province. The club was founded in 1943 and its colours are white and black. Their home stadium, Stade Ali Hamdi, has a capacity of 12,000 spectators. The club is currently playing in the Ligue Nationale du Football Amateur.

Honours
Algerian League Cup
Runners-up (1): 1996

Performance in CAF competitions
CAF Cup
1997 – Quarter-Finals

Results in CAF Cup

References

External links

Football clubs in Algeria
Oum El Bouaghi Province
Association football clubs established in 1943
1943 establishments in Algeria
Sports clubs in Algeria